Selinenes are a group of closely related isomeric chemical compounds which are classified as sesquiterpenes.  The selinenes all have the molecular formula C15H24 and they have been isolated from a variety of plant sources.  α-Selinene and β-selinene are the most common and are two of the principal components of the oil from celery seeds.  γ-Selinene and δ-selinene are less common.

References

Sesquiterpenes
Hydrocarbons